Case Middle School may refer to:

Case Middle School (Hawaii)
Case Middle School (New York)